Gustavo França Amadio (born 24 April 1998), known as Gustavo França or just França, is a Brazilian footballer who plays as a forward for Figueirense.

Club career
Born in São Paulo, Gustavo França played for Corinthians and Nacional-SP as a youth, before moving to Malta in 2016 with Floriana. After featuring sparingly, he was loaned to Kerċem Ajax in January 2017, until June.

Gustavo França returned to his home country shortly after, joining Juventus-SP and returning to the youth setup. He appeared with the first team in the 2018 Copa Paulista, but moved to Internacional in January 2019, being initially assigned to the under-23 team.

In October 2020, Gustavo França was included in Metropolitano's squad for the year's Campeonato Catarinense Série B. On 26 December, he moved to America-RJ for the upcoming season, but returned to Metropolitano shortly after.

On 2 May 2021, Gustavo França was announced at Série C side Paraná. On 6 December, he agreed to a deal with Portuguesa.

On 28 April 2022, after helping Lusa in their Campeonato Paulista Série A2 winning campaign, Gustavo França was loaned to ABC in the third division. On 22 December, he moved to fellow league team Figueirense on a two-year contract.

Career statistics

Honours
Floriana
Maltese FA Trophy: 2016–17

Portuguesa
Campeonato Paulista Série A2: 2022

References

1995 births
Living people
Footballers from São Paulo
Brazilian footballers
Association football forwards
Campeonato Brasileiro Série C players
Clube Atlético Juventus players
Clube Atlético Metropolitano players
America Football Club (RJ) players
Paraná Clube players
Associação Portuguesa de Desportos players
ABC Futebol Clube players
Figueirense FC players
Maltese Premier League players
Floriana F.C. players
Kerċem Ajax F.C. players
Brazilian expatriate footballers
Brazilian expatriate sportspeople in Malta
Expatriate footballers in Malta